Alagiyamanavalam is a village in the Ariyalur taluk of Ariyalur district, Tamil Nadu, India. Melaramanallur, an island hamlet located amid kollidam river is a part of Alagiyamanavalam Revenue Village and Panchayat.

Demographics 

 census, Alagiyamanavalam had a total population of 3,750 with 1,836 males and 1,734 females.

References 

Villages in Ariyalur district